The following page lists all power stations in Mongolia.

Coal

Hydroelectric

Wind

References

Mongolia
Power stations